14th Iranian Majlis was commenced on 6 March 1944 and ended on 12 March 1946. 

In a national history of factionalism, it was the assembly of intense factionalism. As many as seven rival groups labelled fraktions -a term borrowed from the German parliament- in constantly competing with each other, wasted one quarter of the session in obstructionism, and brought persistent instability on the governmental level: during these 24 months, there were seven changes of premiers, nine changes of cabinets, and 110 changes of ministers. The 14th Parliament sat during one of the rare periods in which there was some degree of freedom for political expression.

Fraction members

References

14th term of the Iranian Majlis